Abdul Mukit Khan Bangladeshi politician. He is a 3rd time Member of Parliament elected from Sylhet-3 seat in the Bangladesh National Parliamentary Election. He was elected a member of Parliament the Jatiya Sangsad in the 1988 elections, 1991 elections and the June 1996 elections.

Birth and early life 
Abdul Mukit Khan was born in Dakshin Surma of Sylhet District, Bangladesh.

Political life 
Abdul Mukit Khan is a former MP and an influential leader of the Jatiya Party. He was elected a member of Parliament the Jatiya Sangsad in the 1988 elections, 1991 elections and the June 1996 elections.

See also 

 1988 Bangladeshi general election
 1991 Bangladeshi general election
 June 1996 Bangladeshi general election

References

External links 

 List of 4th Parliament Members -Jatiya Sangsad
 List of 5th Parliament Members- Jatiya Sangsad
 List of 7th Parliament Members- Jatiya Sangsad

Jatiya Party politicians
4th Jatiya Sangsad members
6th Jatiya Sangsad members
5th Jatiya Sangsad members
People from Dakshin Surma Upazila